Lipa pri Frankolovem is a settlement in the Municipality of Vojnik in eastern Slovenia. It lies in the hills north of Frankolovo off the main road from Vojnik to Slovenske Konjice. The area is part of the traditional region of Styria and is now included in the Savinja Statistical Region.

Name
The name of the settlement was changed from Lipa to Lipa pri Frankolovem in 1953.

References

External links
Lipa pri Frankolovem at Geopedia

Populated places in the Municipality of Vojnik